Manuel Esteban de Esesarte Pesqueira (born 6 January 1961) is a Mexican politician from the Institutional Revolutionary Party. From 2009 to 2012 he served as Deputy of the LXI Legislature of the Mexican Congress representing Oaxaca.

References

1961 births
Living people
Politicians from Mexico City
Institutional Revolutionary Party politicians
21st-century Mexican politicians
National Autonomous University of Mexico alumni
Deputies of the LXI Legislature of Mexico
Members of the Chamber of Deputies (Mexico) for Oaxaca